Bus plunge stories are a nickname for a journalistic practice of reporting bus accidents in short articles that describe the vehicle as "plunging" from a bridge or hillside road. The phenomenon has been noted in The New York Times, which published many bus plunge stories from the 1950s through the 1980s, running about 20 such articles in 1968 alone.

The stories exist not only because of their perceived newsworthiness, but because they could be reduced to a few lines and used to fill gaps in the page layout. Further, the words "bus" and "plunge" are short, and can be used in one-column headlines within the narrow, eight-column format that was prevalent in newspapers through the first half of the 20th century. The development of computerized layout tools in the 1970s eventually reduced the need for such filler stories, but newswires continue to carry them.

See also
Filler (media)
"If it bleeds, it leads"
Journalese

References

Newswriting